St. Maria in Jerusalem was a chapel for the city council of Cologne in Germany. It was built between 1424 and 1426 when the Michaelskapelle over the market gate began to prove too small. It was secularised and deconsecrated during the French Revolutionary Wars and destroyed in bombing during World War II.

15th-century architecture
Roman Catholic churches in Cologne
Former buildings and structures in Germany
Buildings and structures in Germany destroyed during World War II